Mikhalova is a Minsk Metro station. It was opened on November 7, 2012, along with the metro stations of Hrushawka and Pyatrowshchyna.

Gallery

References

Minsk Metro stations
Railway stations opened in 2012
2012 establishments in Belarus